Gabriel Hamlin (born 4 January 1997) is a professional rugby league footballer who last played as a  for the Wigan Warriors in the Super League.

He has spent time on loan from Wigan at the Swinton Lions in the 2018 Betfred Championship.

Background
Hamlin was born in Penrith, New South Wales, Australia.

Career
In 2018 he made his Super League début for Wigan against Hull Kingston Rovers.

References

External links
Wigan Warriors profile
SL profile

Living people
Rugby league props
Wigan Warriors players
1997 births